The 2008 European Speed Skating Championships were held at the Kolomna Speed Skating Center in Kolomna, Russia, from 12 to 13 January 2008.

Men's championships

Day 1

Day 2

Allround results 

NQ = Not qualified for the 10000 m (only the best 12 are qualified)
DNS = Did not start
DQ = Disqualified

Source: ISU

Women's championships

Day 1

Day 2

Allround results 

NQ = Not qualified for the 5000 m (only the best 12 are qualified)
DQ = Disqualified
DNS = Did not start

Source: ISU

Rules 
All participating skaters are allowed to skate the first three distances; 12 skaters may take part on the fourth distance. These 12 skaters are determined by taking the standings on the longest of the first three distances, as well as the samalog standings after three distances, and comparing these lists as follows:

 Skaters among the top 12 on both lists are qualified.
 To make up a total of 12, skaters are then added in order of their best rank on either list. Samalog standings take precedence over the longest-distance standings in the event of a tie.

See also 
 2008 World Allround Speed Skating Championships

References

External links 

2008 in speed skating
2008
International speed skating competitions hosted by Russia
Sport in Kolomna
2008 in Russian sport